Air Guilin is a Chinese airline with its headquarters in Xiufeng District, Guilin, Guangxi, and with Guilin Liangjiang International Airport as its main base of flight operations. A joint venture between the Guilin Municipal Government and HNA Group, the airline began operations in June 2016 using Airbus A319 aircraft. It intends to boost the tourism industry in Guilin.

History 
Air Guilin has its origins in Guangxi Airlines, formed in 2013 by HNA Group and the Guilin Municipal Government. This airline was renamed Guilin Airlines in 2014 and planned to commence operations in May of that year, although this did not occur. On 8 September 2015, Guilin Airlines received preliminary approval from the CAAC. In October the airline decided to use Airbus A319 aircraft for its fleet.

Guilin Airlines was renamed Air Guilin in late 2015. On 9 December it unveiled its logo, which incorporates Guilin landmark Elephant Trunk Hill and the slogan of the city. Air Guilin commenced operations on 25 June 2016 with a flight between Guilin and Zhengzhou.

Corporate affairs 
Air Guilin is a joint venture between Guilin Tourism Development Co. (60%) and Guilin Aviation Tourism Group (40%), an HNA Group subsidiary. The groups have invested a total of ¥600 million in the airline.

Destinations

Air Guilin flies to the following destinations in China as of August 2017:

Fleet 

, Air Guilin fleet consists of the following aircraft:

Accidents and incidents 
On January 4, 2019, the captain of Guilin Airlines Flight 1011, an Airbus A319 from Guilin to Yangzhou, let a female passenger into the cockpit regardless of air safety regulations. The incident was exposed to public on November 4, and the captain was grounded for life.

References

External links

  

Airlines of China
Companies based in Guangxi
HNA Group